The 1954–55 Rugby Football League season was the 60th season of rugby league football.

Season summary
Warrington won their second Championship when they beat Oldham 7-3 in the play-off final.  They also ended the regular season as league leaders.

The Challenge Cup winners were Barrow who beat Workington Town 21-12 in the final.

Blackpool Borough joined the competition.

Warrington won the Lancashire League, and Leeds won the Yorkshire League. Barrow beat Oldham 12–2 to win the Lancashire County Cup, and Halifax beat Hull F.C. 22–14 to win the Yorkshire County Cup.

Championship

Play-offs

Challenge Cup

This was also the first time that there was an all-Cumbrian Final. Barrow beat Workington Town 21-12 in the final played at Wembley before a crowd of 66,513. Captained by former Great Britain skipper Willie Horne, this was Barrow’s first Challenge Cup Final win, although have been runners-up on four other occasions.  Jack Grundy, Barrow's  was awarded the Lance Todd Trophy for man-of-the-match.

Barrow: Clive Best, Jimmy Lewthwaite, Phil Jackson, Dennis Goodwin, Frank Castle, Willie Horne, Edward Toohey, Les Belshaw, Vince McKeating, Frank Barton, Jack Grundy, Reg Parker, and Bill Healey.

References

Sources
1954-55 Rugby Football League season at Wigan.rlfans.com
The Challenge Cup at The Rugby Football League website

1954 in English rugby league
1955 in English rugby league
Northern Rugby Football League seasons